The 1995–96 CBA season was the first season of the Chinese Basketball Association.

The season ran from December 10, 1995, to April 7, 1996.

The league had 12 teams for its inaugural campaign and every club played each other twice in the regular season.

Regular season standings
These are the final standings for the 1995-96 CBA regular season.

Playoffs
The Playoffs used a Home-Away system. Total points were used to decide the winner.

Relegations
The bottom 4 teams competed in a knock-out phase. The Nanjing Army and Vanguard / Police were relegated to the Second Division.

CBA Awards
These are the award winners for the 1995-96 CBA regular season.

CBA Most Valuable Player: Hu Weidong (Jiangsu Dragons)
Best Coach: Wang Fei (Bayi Rockets) & Wang Lifa (Guangdong Southern Tigers)

All-Star Game
The first CBA All-Star Game was played on April 9, 1996, in Beijing.

The Blue Team, featuring players including Wang Zhizhi and Adiljan Jun, defeated the White Team 106-98.

See also
 Chinese Basketball Association

References

 
Chinese Basketball Association seasons
League
CBA